Tencho Georgiev Tenev (Bulgarian: Тенчо Георгиев Тенев) (born 9 May 1955) is a Bulgarian football manager. He is currently manager of Marek Dupnitsa in the Bulgarian A Football Group.

References

Living people
1955 births
Bulgarian football managers